Deh-e Moradkhan (also Romanized as Deh-e Morādkhān) is a village in Sahneh Rural District, in the Central District of Sahneh County, Kermanshah Province, Iran. At the 2006 census, its population was 627, in 160 families.

References 

Populated places in Sahneh County